Place of execution may refer to:

 The site at which capital punishment is carried out
 A Place of Execution, a crime novel by Val McDermid first published in 1999